The AN/SPN-35  is a computerized automatic landing system installed on the Tarawa-class amphibious assault ship and other LHA/LHD-class warships to give control for aircraft during the final approach and landing.

The Joint precision approach and landing system (JPALS) is slated to replace the AN/SPN-35 on U.S. Navy amphibious assault ships.

Description
The AN/SPN-35 is used to offer guidance to the aircraft pilot on final approach. It provides relative azimuth, range, and elevation information to the radar operator, who relays this as verbal guidance to the aircraft pilot on approach.

The AN/SPN-35A variant has two antennas: the azimuth antenna (AS-1292/TPN-8) and the elevation antenna (AS-1669/SPN-35). The azimuth antenna is located above the azimuth drive assembly on the stabilized yoke. The elevation antenna is mounted on the elevation drive assembly adjacent to the azimuth antenna.

History 
The AN/SPN-35 was developed from the ground-based AN/TPN-8 landing approach control radar. A prototype was evaluated aboard the  about a year later as a replacement for the AN/SPN-8 on ASW carriers and small attack carriers. As of 1965, the AN/SPN-35 was being used "primarily on the ASW type carriers."

Platforms

Royal Australian Navy

Spanish Navy 
 Príncipe de Asturias

Royal Navy

United States Navy 

 Ship classes known to carry this system:
 Tarawa-class amphibious assault ship
 Wasp-class amphibious assault ship
 America-class amphibious assault ship
  - Replaced by AN/SPN-46 in the late 90s.
 Individual ships known to carry this system:
 
 
  - Installed 1965 while undergoing overhaul at San Francisco Bay Naval Shipyard.
  - Initial testing and evaluation
  - Initial testing and evaluation
 
 

 
 USS Inchon (MCS-12)

Variants
 AN/SPN-35: Original model that entered service.
 AN/SPN-35A: Improved stabilization system to compensate for pitch and roll of carrier. Replaces the original mechanical-hydraulic stabilization of the original with an electromechanical stabilization system.
 AN/SPN-35B:
 AN/SPN-35C: Upgrade to AN/SPN-35B. Adds Moving Target Detection (MTD), Track While Scan (TWS), and Built-In Test (BIT) capability.

See Also
 AN/SPN-46(V)1

References

External Links
   Refer to page 7 of Sept. 1963 issue for discussion of impact for SPN-35 relative to what came before.

Naval radars
Military radars of the United States